Marriage Story is a 1992 South Korean romantic comedy film directed by Kim Eui-suk and starring Choi Min-soo and Shim Hye-jin. It was the highest-grossing South Korean film of 1992, and became the fourth most highly attended Korean film between 1990 and 1995.

Plot
The film follows the romantic relationship between middle-class couple Kim Tae-kyu and Choe Ji-hae, from their wedding to a break-up and eventual reconciliation.

Cast
Choi Min-soo as Kim Tae-kyu
Shim Hye-jin as Choe Ji-hae
Lee Hee-do as Yun Il-jung
Kim Hui-ryeong as Oh Hyang-suk
Kim Seong-su as PD Han
Dokgo Young-jae as Park Chang-su
Yang Taek-jo as Cha-jang
Joo Ho-sung as Shin Seon-bae
Yun Mun-sik as Jjik-sae
Kim Ki-hyeon as Columbo

References

External links

1990s Korean-language films
South Korean romantic comedy films
Films directed by Kim Ui-seok
1992 romantic comedy films